The Kintetsu 21020 series is a limited express train of the Kintetsu Railway. Its nickname is Urban Liner Next. It received the Good Design Award and the Blue Ribbon Award in 2003.

References 

Electric multiple units of Japan
21020 series
Kinki Sharyo multiple units
1500 V DC multiple units of Japan